Sean Desai (born April 21, 1983) is an American football coach who is the defensive coordinator for the Philadelphia Eagles of the National Football League (NFL). He is the first NFL coordinator of Indian descent. He previously served as the associate head coach and defensive assistant for the Seattle Seahawks and also previously served as an assistant coach for the Chicago Bears, Boston College, University of Miami and Temple University.

Coaching career

Temple
Desai began his coaching career at Temple University as a defensive and special teams coach from 2006 until 2010. In 2010, he served as the special teams coordinator for the Owls.

Miami
In 2011, Desai joined the University of Miami as their assistant director of football operations.

Boston College
In 2012, Desai joined as the running backs coach and special teams coordinator at Boston College.

Chicago Bears
In 2013, Desai was hired by the Chicago Bears as a quality control assistant under head coach Marc Trestman. As a quality control assistant, he worked with the Bears' defensive backs and linebackers while also assisting the special teams coaches. Desai was retained by head coach John Fox in 2015 and Matt Nagy in 2018. On February 8, 2019, Desai was promoted to safeties coaches. The Bears went 8–8 in 2019 and missed the playoffs. Under his coaching, Eddie Jackson was named to the Pro Bowl. On January 22, 2021, Desai was promoted to defensive coordinator, replacing Chuck Pagano, following his retirement. Desai became the first person of Indian descent to become a coordinator in the National Football League. He was not retained by the team following the departure of head coach Matt Nagy after the 2021 season.

Seattle Seahawks
On February 11, 2022, Desai was hired by the Seattle Seahawks as an Associate Defensive head coach

Philadelphia Eagles
On February 28, 2023, Desai was hired by the Philadelphia Eagles as their defensive coordinator under head coach Nick Sirianni, replacing Jonathan Gannon, who departed to become the head coach of the Arizona Cardinals.

Personal life
Desai received his undergraduate degree in philosophy and political science, with a minor in biology, from Boston University in 2004. Desai earned a master's degree in higher and postsecondary education from Columbia University in 2005. Desai earned his doctorate in educational administration in 2008 at Temple University, and was an adjunct professor for two years.

References

External links
 Philadelphia Eagles profile

1983 births
Living people
American sportspeople of Indian descent
Boston College Eagles football coaches
Boston University alumni
Chicago Bears coaches
Miami Hurricanes football coaches
National Football League defensive coordinators
People from Shelton, Connecticut
Philadelphia Eagles coaches
Seattle Seahawks coaches
Teachers College, Columbia University alumni
Temple Owls football coaches
Temple University alumni